Juan Carlos León Zambrano (born 24 January 1975) is an Ecuadorian football manager and former player who played as a midfielder. He is the current manager of Orense.

Career
Born in Esmeraldas, León represented Barcelona SC, Calvi as a youth. After making his senior debut with Audaz Octubrino in 1999, he went on to play for Panamá, Santos Ecuador, Valle del Chota, Paladín "S", 9 de Octubre and Liceo Cristiano.

After retiring, León worked for Barcelona and Norte América's youth categories before joining Independiente del Valle in the middle of 2009. After winning several titles with the under-16s and under-18s, he led the under-20s to the 2018 U-20 Copa Libertadores final, and was later named in charge of reserve team Alianza Cotopaxi for the 2018 Segunda Categoría.

After winning the Segunda Categoría and promoting Alianza (later named Independiente Juniors) to the Serie B, León renewed his contract with the club. On 2 January 2020, he was appointed manager of former team 9 de Octubre in the second division, and led the side back to the Serie A after a 25-year absence, also winning the title for the first time.

On 2 August 2022, León was sacked by 9 de Octubre, and took over fellow top tier side Orense eleven days later.

Honours
Independiente Juniors
Segunda Categoría: 2018

9 de Octubre
Ecuadorian Serie B: 2020

References

External links
 

1975 births
Living people
Sportspeople from Esmeraldas, Ecuador
Ecuadorian footballers
Association football midfielders
Ecuadorian football managers
Orense S.C. managers
9 de Octubre F.C. managers